Darreh-ye Akhund (also Romanized as Darreh-ye Ākhūnd) is a village in Sarfaryab Rural District, Sarfaryab District, Charam County, Kohgiluyeh and Boyer-Ahmad Province, Iran. At the 2006 census, its population was 286, in 63 families.

References 

Populated places in Charam County